The 1973 Air Canada Silver Broom was held at the Regina Exhibition Stadium in Regina, Saskatchewan, Canada from March 19–24, 1973. The tournament was won by Sweden, with a team from Djursholms CK.

Teams

Standings

Results

Draw 1

Draw 2

Draw 3

Draw 4

Draw 5

Draw 6

Draw 7

Draw 8

Draw 9

Playoffs

Semifinals

Final

References

External links

World Men's Curling Championship
Curling
Air Canada Silver Broom, 1973
Curling in Saskatchewan
1973 in Saskatchewan
Sports competitions in Regina, Saskatchewan
International curling competitions hosted by Canada
March 1973 sports events in Canada